Kuleshovka is a rural locality (a selo) in Azovsky District in Rostov Oblast, Russia. Population:

References

Rural localities in Rostov Oblast